B'Rock Orchestra (pronounced as bee rock) is a Belgian Baroque orchestra. The orchestra combines works by established baroque composers like Johann Sebastian Bach, Antonio Vivaldi and Georg Friedrich Händel with the lesser-known repertoire of the 17th and 18th centuries like Georg Philipp Telemann, Alessandro Scarlatti and Giovanni Battista Pergolesi. In addition, the orchestra focuses on giving first performances of new music written with its historic instruments in mind. The orchestra also has a reputation for cross-genre productions like Early Music in combination with theatre, opera, visual art, dance and/or video.

History
The orchestra was set up in Ghent in 2005 on the initiative of harpsichordist Frank Agsteribbe, double bass player Tom Devaere and managers Hendrik Storme and Tomas Bisschop. The basis was an urge for renewal in the world of Early Music. B'Rock Orchestra does not work with one conductor but engages guest conductors, soloists and choirs. The orchestra gives about 45 concerts every season, both in Belgium and abroad.

In 2012, B'Rock Orchestra made its debut at Royal Opera De Munt/La Monnaie in Brussels with the opera Orlando by Händel under the baton of René Jacobs. B'Rock was voted 'Ensemble of the Year 2015' by the Belgian classical radio channel Klara.

B'Rock Orchestra has developed structural partnerships with the Royal Opera De Munt/La Monnaie in Brussels, deSingel international arts campus in Antwerp, the Ruhrtriënnale in the Ruhr region in Germany and the Opera de Rouen in France.

Discography 
 2008: Georg Philipp Telemann Suites for Strings 
 2009: Georg Friedrich Händel Concerti grossi, Ouvertures 
 2010: David Petersen Speelstukken 
 2011: Vivaldi/Cage 8 Seasons 
 2014: Georg Friedrich Händel Orlando 
 2015: Georg Friedrich Händel "Der Messias" 
2018: Franz Peter Schubert Symphonies 1 & 6 
2020: Franz Peter Schubert Symphonies 2 & 3 
2021: Franz Peter Schubert Symphonies 4 & 5 
2022: Franz Peter Schubert Unfinished and Great Symphonies 
2022: Philippus van Steelant Antwerp Requiem c. 1650

References

Sources
Details on this web page were copied from the free text on under the CC BY-SA and the GFDL

External links 
 Website of B'Rock Orchestra

Baroque music
Belgian orchestras
Classical music